Cafercan Aksu (born 15 January 1987) is a Turkish association football player who plays as a striker for TFF Third League club Siirt İl Özel İdaresi SK.

Career
Formerly he played for Galatasaray youth team. He was loaned out to Rizespor at the beginning of 2005–06 season but he returned to Galatasaray during winter transfer window. However, without playing one minute in his second spell at the club, he was sent to İstanbul Büyükşehir Belediyespor in summer 2006. In the 2007–08 season, he was loaned to Türk Telekom League A side Orduspor. For 2008–09 season he is loaned to Gaziantep Büyükşehir Belediyespor.

References

External links

1987 births
Sportspeople from Antalya
Living people
Turkish footballers
Turkey youth international footballers
Turkey under-21 international footballers
Association football forwards
Galatasaray S.K. footballers
Çaykur Rizespor footballers
İstanbul Başakşehir F.K. players
Orduspor footballers
Gaziantep F.K. footballers
1922 Konyaspor footballers
Boluspor footballers
Giresunspor footballers
TKİ Tavşanlı Linyitspor footballers
Karşıyaka S.K. footballers
Kırklarelispor footballers
Darıca Gençlerbirliği footballers
Süper Lig players
TFF First League players
TFF Second League players
TFF Third League players
Mediterranean Games silver medalists for Turkey
Mediterranean Games medalists in football
Competitors at the 2005 Mediterranean Games